The following is a timeline of the history of the city of Honolulu, on Oahu, in the U.S. state of Hawaii.

1700s-1800s

 1794 - Honolulu’s safe harbour discovered.
 1795 - Area populated by "Kamehameha's chiefs and followers."
 1810 - Kamehameha I relocates to inner harbour of Honolulu from Waikiki.
 1816 - Fort built.
 1820 - Honolulu becomes capital of Hawaii and the principal residence of the sovereign.
 1826 - C. Brewer & Co. founded.
 1833
 Oahu Charity School founded.
 Brinsmade, Ladd, and Hooper in business.
 1836
 Lahaina, Maui becomes capital from 1837 to 1845.
 Royal Hawaiian Band founded.
 Sandwich Island Gazette and Journal of Commerce begins publication.
 1840
 Royal School founded.
 The Polynesian newspaper begins publication.
 1842 - Kawaiahaʻo Church built.
 1843
 Paulet Affair (1843)
 Cathedral of Our Lady of Peace built.
 1845 
 The capital is moved from Lahaina to Honolulu, with ʻIolani Palace as the royal residence.
 1846 - Honolulu Police Department established.
 1849
 August–September: French invasion of Honolulu.
 Hackfeld and Company in business.
 1850 - City becomes capital of the islands.
 1851
 Honolulu Fire Department organized.
 Castle & Cooke in business.
 1853
 Oahu College active.
 British Club founded.
 1854 - Melchers Building constructed.
 1856
 Pacific Commercial Advertiser newspaper begins publication.
 Honolulu Sailor's Home opens.
 1857 - Honolulu Rifles instituted.
 1858 - Bishop & Co. (bank) founded.>
 1860 - Queen's Hospital built.
 1863
 Population: 14,000 (estimate).
 Royal Mausoleum of Hawaii built.
 1865 - Hawaiian Gazette newspaper begins publication.
 1866 - Wharf constructed.
 1870 - Post office built.
 1872
 Hawaiian Hotel in business.
 Population: 14,852.
 1873 - Aliiolani Hale (Parliament House) built.
 1877 - Kapiolani Park opens.
 1879
 ʻIolani Palace built.
 Honolulu Library and Reading Room Association founded.
 1884 - Kapuāiwa Building constructed.
 1886 - Fire in Chinatown.
 1889 - Bishop Museum and Manoa Chinese cemetery founded.
 1890 - Population: 22,907.
 1891 - Scottish Thistle Club founded.
 1892
 Hawaiian Historical Society established.
 Harbour deepened.
 1893 - January 17: Overthrow of the Kingdom of Hawaii by Hawaiian League.
 1894 - Theo H. Davies & Co. in business.
 1896 - Yamato Shinbun Japanese/English-language newspaper begins publication.
 1898
 City becomes part of the U.S. Territory of Hawaii.
 Honolulu Stock and Bond Exchange established.
 1899 - U.S. Naval Station, Honolulu established.
 1900
 Population: 39,306.
 Alexander Young Hotel built.
 Honolulu Japanese Merchants Association and Young Women's Christian Association chapter organized.
 Alexander & Baldwin incorporated.
 January 20: Fire in Chinatown.

1900s

 1901
 Streetcar begins operating.
 Honolulu Shinbun newspaper begins publication.
 1907 - University of Hawaiʻi, Honolulu County, and Pacific Scientific Institution established.
 1908 - Honolulu Japanese Sake Brewing Co. in business.
 1909 - Joseph J. Fern becomes mayor.
 1910 - Population: 52,183.
 1912 - Honolulu Star-Bulletin in publication.
 1913 - Hawaii State Library building constructed.
 1920
 John H. Wilson becomes mayor.
 Mission Houses Museum established.
 1922
 Princess Theatre opens.
 Hawaii Theatre built.
 KGU signs on the air as Honolulu and Hawaii's first radio station
 1924 - Central Union Church dedicated.
 1926 - Honolulu Stadium opens.
 1927
 John Rodgers Airport and Honolulu Academy of Arts open.
 YWCA Building (Honolulu, Hawaii) constructed.
 1928 - Honolulu Municipal Building constructed.
 1929 - Honolulu Board of Water Supply established.
 1930 - Foster Botanical Garden bequeathed to city.
 1931 - Kapiolani Maternity and Gynecological Hospital active.
 1932 - Massie Affair criminal trial took place.
 1936 - Waikiki Theatre opens.
 1941
 Roman Catholic Diocese of Honolulu established.
 December 7: Japanese forces attack US naval base at Pearl Harbor.
 1947 - Honolulu Zoo established.
 1948 - Foodland opens its first store.
 1951 - Chung-Hua Hsin Pao Chinese-language newspaper begins publication.
 1952 - KGMB signs on the air as Honolulu's and Hawaii's first television station
 1953 - Cherry Blossom Festival begins.
 1955 - Waikiki Beach Press newspaper begins publication.
 1959 
 Honolulu Diamond Sangha founded.
 Ala Moana Center opens
 City becomes part of U.S. State of Hawaii
 1960
 Hawaii National Bank headquartered in city.
 Population: 248,034.
 1961 - August 4: Birth of Barack Obama.
 1962 - Honolulu International Airport terminal rebuilt.
 1965 - Foreign trade zone established.
 1968 - Oceanic Cable begins cable television operations.
 1969 - Hawaii State Capitol built.
 1971 - TheBus (public transport) established.
 1975 - Aloha Stadium opens near city.
 1980 - Population: 365,048.
 1986 - Japanese Cultural Center of Hawai‘i founded.
 1988 - Hawaii Maritime Center opens.
 1990 - Population: 365,272.
 1993 - U.S. Kunia Regional SIGINT Operations Center active near city.
 1996 - City website online.

2000s

 2005 - Mufi Hannemann becomes mayor.
 2010
 Honolulu Civil Beat begins publication.
  Kirk Caldwell becomes mayor, succeeded by Peter Carlisle.
 The Honolulu Star-Advertiser begins publications after the merger of the Advertiser and Star-Bulletin
 Population: 390,738.
 2013 - Kirk Caldwell becomes mayor again.
 2014 - Sit-lie ordinance effected.

See also
 Honolulu history
 List of mayors of Honolulu

References

Bibliography

Published in the 1800s
 
 
 
 
 
 
 
 
 
 

Published in the 1900s
 
 
 
 
 
 
 
  (fulltext via Open Library)
 
 
 

Published in the 2000s

External links

 
 Items related to Honolulu, various dates (via Europeana).
 Items related to Honolulu, various dates (via US Library of Congress, Prints & Photos division)
 Items related to Honolulu, various dates (via Digital Public Library of America).

Years in Hawaii
Hawaii-related lists
 
honolulu